Emilian Galaicu-Păun (22 June 1964) is an author and editor from Chișinău, member of the Writers' Union of Romania and the Writers' Union of Moldova.

Works 
Lumina proprie, Editura Literatura Artistică, Chișinău, 1986
Abece-Dor, Editura Literatura Artistică, Chișinău, 1989
Levitații deasupra hăului, Editura Hyperion, Chișinău, 1991
Cel bătut îl duce pe cel nebătut, Editura Dacia, Cluj, 1994
Gesturi. Trilogia nimicului, Editura Cartier, Chișinău, 1996
Yin Time, Editura Vinea, București, 1999
Poezia de după poezie. Ultimul deceniu, Editura Cartier, Chișinău, 1999
Gestuar, Editura Axa, Botoșani, 2002
Arme grăitoare, Editura Cartier, Chișinău, 2009

References

External links 
 TRANSITIONS ONLINE: Books: New Sprouts of Moldovan Literature
 Emilian Galaicu-Păun

1964 births
People from Soroca District
Moldovan journalists
Male journalists
Radio Free Europe/Radio Liberty people
Moldovan writers
Moldovan male writers
Living people
Recipients of the Order of Honour (Moldova)